Ray Schoonover may refer to:

 Ray Schoonover (comics), Marvel Comics character
 Ray H. Schoonover (1896–1966), American businessman and politician